Extraordinary People may refer to: 
Extraordinary People (2015 book and video series), by author and musician Michael Hearst
Extraordinary People (1992 TV series), documentary series broadcast on ITV between 1992 and 1993
Extraordinary People (2003 TV series), documentary series broadcast on Channel 5 since